Margaret Pargeter is the pen name used by a popular writer of 50 romantic novels in Mills & Boon from 1975 to 1986. No information exists as to the true identity or identities of the writer(s) who employed this pen name.

Bibliography

Single novels (Harlequin Romance)
Winds from the Sea
Ride a Black Horse
The Kilted Stranger
Blue Skies, Dark Waters
Hold Me Captive
Stormy Rapture
Never Go Back
Wild Inheritance
Flamingo Moon
Better to Forget
Jewelled Caftan
Marriage Impossible
Midnight Magic
The Wild Rowan
Man Called Cameron
The Devil's Bride
Only You
Savage Possession
Boomerang Bride
Autumn Song
The Dark Oasis
Dark Surrender
Kiss of a Tyrant
Deception
At First Glance
Captivity
Not Far Enough
Loving Slave
Collision
Substitute Bride
Storm Cycle
Prelude to a Song
Man from the Kimberleys
Caribbean Gold
Silver Flame
Storm in the Night
Chains of Regret
Clouded Rapture
Demetrious Line
Odds Against
Born of the Wind
Total Surrender
Captive of Fate
Model of Deception
Impasse
Lost Enchantment
Other Side of Paradise
Scarlet Woman
Beyond Reach
Misconception

Omnibus in collaboration
Winds From The Sea/Island of Darkness/Wind River (1979) (with Rebecca Stratton and Margaret Way)
Desert Castle/Collision Course/Ride A Black Horse (1980) (with Isobel Chace and Jane Donnelly)
Return to Tuckarimba/Hold Me Captive/Greek Bridal (1981) (with Amanda Doyle and Henrietta Reid)
Handful of Stars/Flamingo Moon/Lion in Venice (1982) (with Lucy Gillen and Margaret Rome)
Garland of Marigolds/Red Diamond/Kilted Stranger (1983) (with Isobel Chace and Dorothy Cork)
Reluctant Neighbor/Never Go Back/Island Masquerade (1983) (with Sheila Douglas and Sally Wentworth)

External links
Susanne McCarthy's Webpage @ Fantastic Fiction

Romantic fiction writers
Women romantic fiction writers
Year of birth missing
Possibly living people
Women novelists
Pseudonymous women writers
20th-century pseudonymous writers